Archie Paul "Dizzy" McLeod (1902 – 1993) was a collegiate athletics coach. He served as the head football coach (1932–1942), basketball coach (1929–1933), baseball coach (1928–1930, 1933–1935, 1937–1942), and athletic director (1932–1945) at Furman University.

McLeod was an assistant football coach at Clemson University in 1927.

Head coaching record

Football

References

1902 births
1993 deaths
American football running backs
Baseball pitchers
Clemson Tigers football coaches
Furman Paladins athletic directors
Furman Paladins baseball coaches
Furman Paladins baseball players
Furman Paladins football coaches
Furman Paladins football players
Furman Paladins men's basketball coaches
People from Fountain Inn, South Carolina
Players of American football from South Carolina
Baseball players from South Carolina
Basketball coaches from South Carolina